Troitsk is a rural locality (a settlement) in Pushtulimsky Selsoviet, Yeltsovsky District, Altai Krai, Russia. The population was 22 as of 2013. There are 4 streets.

Geography 
Troitsk is located 26 km southeast of Yeltsovka (the district's administrative centre) by road. Bakhta and Chistaya Griva are the nearest rural localities.

References 

Rural localities in Yeltsovsky District